Power Rangers Ninja Storm is a television series and the eleventh season of the Power Rangers franchise, based on the 26th Super Sentai series Ninpuu Sentai Hurricaneger. The season marked a series of firsts in the franchise, being that it was the first to be filmed in New Zealand, the first to not be produced by MMPR Productions, and the first to air on ABC in its entirety; debuting on February 15, 2003 on ABC Kids.

Synopsis 
In the city of Blue Bay Harbor, Shane Clarke, Tori Hanson and Dustin Brooks are three students at the Wind Ninja Academy. Their less than stellar performance and tardiness gets them the occasional lecture from their Sensei, Kanoi Watanabe. One day, the academy is attacked by Lothor, a banished ninja master and Kanoi's identical twin brother, who has returned to capture all the ninja students. Shane, Tori and Dustin are the only three remaining students, and along with Sensei, who has been transformed into a guinea pig by Lothor, and his son Cam, retreat into the underground Ninja Ops. There, the three are given Wind Morphers, which allow them to transform into Power Rangers Ninja Storm and protect the city of Blue Bay Harbor from Lothor's forces.

When Lothor demonstrates his ability to make his monsters grow, the Rangers unleash the Ninja Zords, which could combine into the Storm Megazord and destroy monsters with its arsenal of Power Spheres, activated by special ninja power disks. Lothor again raises the stakes by sending his new allies to battle the Wind Rangers - the Thunder Rangers, Blake and Hunter Bradley, who have their own Thunder Zords. The Thunder Rangers are on a mission to destroy the Wind Rangers' Sensei, who they believed to be responsible for their parents' death, but a visit from the afterlife from Blake and Hunter's parents show them the truth - that it was Lothor who killed them. The Thunder Rangers see the error of their ways and join the Wind Rangers in the battle against Lothor, bringing the Thunder and Ninja Zords together to form the Thunderstorm Megazord.

When the Rangers lose their powers, Cam uses the Scroll of Time to travel into the past and retrieve the Samurai Amulet, a family heirloom in the possession of his late mother, where he discovers how Lothor rose to power. Cam returns to the present and uses the amulet to become the Green Samurai Ranger, armed with the Samurai Star Megazord, which later combines with the Rangers' zords to form the Hurricane Megazord. A lost scroll would later reveal to Cam the Lightning Riff Blaster, which could summon the Mighty Mammoth Zord, which combines with the Thunderstorm Megazord or the Hurricane Megazord to form the Thunderstorm Ultrazord or the Hurricane Ultrazord.

In a last-ditch effort to take over the world, Lothor attempts to open the Abyss of Evil and release its evil, causing all the monsters that were defeated over the season to be resurrected. In a final battle, the rangers, along with the rescued ninja students manage to defeats Lothor's revived army, but he steals the Samurai Amulet and uses it to take away all of the Rangers' powers. However the Wind Rangers combine their inner ninja powers to overpower Lothor and throw him into the abyss. After the battle, the powerless Rangers become ninja masters at the Wind Ninja Academy.

Cast and characters 
Ninja Storm Rangers
Pua Magasiva as Shane Clarke, the Red Wind Ranger.
Sally Martin as Tori Hanson, the Blue Wind Ranger.
Glenn McMillan as Waldo "Dustin" Brooks, the Yellow Wind Ranger.
Adam Tuominen as Hunter Bradley, the Crimson Thunder Ranger.
Jorgito Vargas Jr. as Blake Bradley, the Navy Thunder Ranger.
Jason Chan as Cameron "Cam" Watanabe, the Green Samurai Ranger.
Supporting characters
Grant McFarland as Sensei Kanoi Watanabe (voice and human form)
Daniel Sing as Young Sensei Kanoi Watanabe
Megan Nicol as Kelly
Robbie Magasiva as Porter Clarke, Shane's brother
Roseanne Liang as Miko Watanabe 
Villains
Grant McFarland as Lothor
Daniel Sing as Young Kiya Watanabe
Katrina Devine as Marah
Katrina Browne as Kapri
Peter Rowley as the voice of Zurgane
Bruce Hopkins as the voice of Choobo
Michael Hurst as the voice of Vexacus
Craig Parker as the voice of Motodrone
Jeremy Birchall as the voice of Shimazu

Episodes

Home Media
In the United States, the series was released by Buena Vista Home Entertainment on five volumes, each containing a random amount of episodes:
 Prelude to a Storm (June 3, 2003, 1-3)
 Looming Thunder (September 2, 2003, 4-7)
 Lightning Strikers (September 2, 2003, 10-13)
 Samurai's Journey (December 9, 2003, 15-18)
 Cyber Clash (December 9, 2003, 19-22)

These volume sets were also released in regions where BVHE held distribution rights. In countries where licensing was held by Jetix Europe, releases depended on the region or distributor.

BVHE released the complete series in the United Kingdom on July 28, 2008, on an eight-disc boxset. In the United States, Shout! Factory released the complete series on a five-disc set on June 21, 2016 in the United States.

Comics
In the aftermath of the "Shattered Grid" storyline of Mighty Morphin' Power Rangers, called "Beyond the Grid" Cam joined a team of Rangers, called the Solar Rangers, with the Ranger Slayer, Mike Corbett, Andros, Tanya, and an undefined Dino Charge Ranger.

References

External links

 

 
2000s American science fiction television series
2003 American television series debuts
2003 American television series endings
ABC Family original programming
American action television series
American adventure television series
American Broadcasting Company original programming
American fantasy television series
English-language television shows
Martial arts television series
Ninja fiction
Ninja Storm
Television series about siblings
Television series about size change
Television series by Disney
Television shows filmed in New Zealand
Television shows set in California